The 2007 Falken Tasmania Challenge is the thirteenth round of the 2007 V8 Supercar season. It was held on the weekend of the 16 to 18 November at Symmons Plains Raceway in Tasmania.

References

External links
 Tasmania Challenge website

Falken Tasmania Challenge